Zigon Township  is a township in the Tharrawaddy District of the Bago Region in Burma. The principal town is Zigon.

References

External links 
 Township map of Sagaing Region, Myanmar Information Management Unit (MIMU)

Townships of the Bago Region
Tharrawaddy District